Four ships of the French Navy have been named in honour of the 18th century admiral count Toussaint-Guillaume Picquet de la Motte.

French ships named La Motte-Picquet 
  (1859), a sail and steam aviso
 , a coastal transport
  (1912),  the planned leadship and cancelled class of light cruiser
  (1923), a  cruiser.
  (D645), an F70 type anti-submarine frigate

Notes and references

Notes

References

Bibliography 
 
 

French Navy ship names